Nambiarath Appunni Tharakan is a Kathakali artist from Kerala, India. He work as Uduthukettal (Make up, dressing and costume of Kathakali performer) expert at aniyara (behind the curtains) of Kathakali. He received several awards including Kerala Sangeetha Nataka Akademi Award, Kerala Kalamandalam Award for Best Kathakali Aniyara Artist and Kerala Kalamandalam Mukundaraja Award.

Biography
Nambiarath Appunni Tharakan was born on August 3, 1928, at Mangod near Cherpulassery in present-day Palakkad district, to Kunjan Tharakan and Kutty Pennamma. He dropped out his education halfway and went to the Vazhengada temple to earn a living. He learned the Uduthukettal from well known Kathakali artist Pambath Sankaran, also known as Kollankode Sankaran, the husband of her sister Kunjimalu Amma. He started his career at the Olappamanna Mana at the age of fourteen. He began working independently at the age of eighteen.

He became a permanent employee of the Kerala Kalamandalam at the age of 50 and retired in 1984. He got a job as Aniyarakkaran (behind the curtain artist) in Kalamandalam with the help of poet Olappamanna Subramanian Namboodiripad who was the president of Kalamandalam that time. Until then, the post of Aniyarakkaran was not in the Kalamandalam. He was also main Aniyara artist of the Kottayam PSV Natyasangham, the Iringalakuda Unnai Warrier Memorial Kalanilayam and the Perur Sadanam Kathakali Academy. Since the inception of the Kerala State School Kalothsavam in 1953, Appunni Tharakan has been preparing school children for 55 consecutive years.

Personal life
He and his wife Parvathy have 3 children.

Awards and recognitions
 Kerala Kalamandalam Award for Best Kathakali Aniyara Artist, 2021
 Kerala Kalamandalam Mukundaraja Award
 Kalamandalam Krishnan Nair Award
 Kerala Sangeetha Nataka Akademi Award
 Veerasrimgala from Mangod desham
 Vellinezhi Olappamanna Mana Special Award
 Award from Kozhikode Thodayam
 He was honored at the International Kathakali and Koodiyattam Festival in Dubai.

Family
He and his wife Parvathy have four children, Unnikrishnan, Sivaraman, Mohanan and late Sankaranarayanan. Sivaraman is a teacher at the Kerala Kalamandalam. His youngest son Mohanan is an Uduthorukkal artist.

References

People from Palakkad district
Kathakali exponents
1928 births
Living people